We Come as Friends is a 2014 Austrian-French documentary film written, directed and produced by Hubert Sauper. The film premiered in-competition in the World Cinema Documentary Competition at 2014 Sundance Film Festival on January 18, 2014. It won the Special Jury Award for Cinematic Bravery at the festival.

The film also premiered in-competition at the 64th Berlin International Film Festival on February 8, 2014. It won the Peace Film Award at the festival.

The film later premiered at 43rd New Directors/New Films Festival on March 20, 2014. The film also premiered at 57th San Francisco International Film Festival on April 25, 2014 in competition for Golden Gate Documentary Feature.

Synopsis
The film focuses on war-ravaged South Sudan fighting for independence from North Sudan and its President Omar al-Bashir.

Reception

We Come as Friends received mostly positive reviews upon its premiere at the 2014 Sundance Film Festival. On review aggregator Rotten Tomatoes, the film holds an approval rating of 97% based on 30 reviews, with an average rating of 8.1/10. On Metacritic, the film has a score of 80 out of 100 from 10 critics, indicating "generally favorable reviews".

Rob Nelson of Variety wrote in his review that We Come as Friends becomes more disturbing as it goes, building to a terrible crescendo in a series of scenes near the end of the film." Boyd van Hoeij in his review for The Hollywood Reporter called the film "A sobering and superbly edited documentary about South Sudan, a country that became independent in 2011 but turns out to be not so independent after all." Dan Schindel from Nonfics praised the film by saying that "A devastating, haunting, but absolutely necessary travelogue of South Sudan. This film is an instructional in how imperialism in Africa has not died off, but merely taken on a new form."

Chuck Bowen of Slant magazine gave the film four out of five stars and said that "We Come As Friends is terrifyingly direct and intimate. Portraying the neocolonialist exploitation of the recently established South Sudan, director Hubert Sauper devises a metaphor that's both risky and brilliantly evocative." In his review for Slug magazine, Cody Kirkland praised the director Sauper by saying that "Hubert Sauper presents a thought-provoking look inside the war-torn and extremely impoverished mother continent" and called the film "a powerful, troubling and possibly life-changing look into the real people involved in this monumental disaster, and the real consequences of economic and cultural imperialism." On December 1, the film was selected as one of 15 shortlisted for the Academy Award for Best Documentary Feature.

Accolades

References

External links
 Official website
 
 

2014 films
2014 documentary films
French documentary films
Austrian documentary films
Sundance Film Festival award winners
Documentary films about African politics
Documentary films about Sudan
Films directed by Hubert Sauper
2010s French films